The Central Group is one of the island groups of the Azores, Portugal. It comprises the islands of Pico, Terceira, São Jorge, Faial and Graciosa.

References 

 
Islands of Macaronesia
Geography of Southwestern Europe